Francisco Quina (24 December 1930 – 10 November 2006) was a Portuguese sailor. He competed in the Dragon event at the 1972 Summer Olympics.

References

External links
 

1930 births
2006 deaths
Portuguese male sailors (sport)
Olympic sailors of Portugal
Sailors at the 1972 Summer Olympics – Dragon
Place of birth missing